Fidel Herrera Beltrán (Nopaltepec, Veracruz, March 7, 1949) is a Mexican politician and former governor of the state of Veracruz. A member of Institutional Revolutionary Party (PRI), he was elected governor in 2004. Prior to that, he was deputy in the XLIX Legislature for Cosamaloapan, LI Legislature for Pánuco, LV Legislature for Cosamaloapan and LVII Legislature for Boca del Río and a senator representing Veracruz in the LVIII Legislature. He is a lawyer by profession, having attended law school at UNAM.

In 2013, Forbes magazine named Herrera as one of the 10 most corrupt Mexican politicians, citing his alleged links to the Los Zetas drug-trafficking cartel.

References

External links
Official Biography (Spanish): http://portal.veracruz.gob.mx/portal/page?_pageid=153,4200549&_dad=portal&_schema=PORTAL

Governors of Veracruz
Living people
1949 births
Institutional Revolutionary Party politicians
Members of the Chamber of Deputies (Mexico)
Members of the Senate of the Republic (Mexico)
Politicians from Veracruz
National Autonomous University of Mexico alumni
Alumni of the London School of Economics
20th-century Mexican politicians
21st-century Mexican politicians